Archidendron forbesii is a species of legume in the family Fabaceae. It is found only in Papua New Guinea. It is threatened by habitat loss.

References

forbesii
Flora of Papua New Guinea
Vulnerable plants
Taxonomy articles created by Polbot